Salzburg Stories (German: Salzburger Geschichten) is a 1957 West German romantic comedy film directed by Kurt Hoffmann and starring Marianne Koch, Paul Hubschmid and Peter Mosbacher. It was shot at the Bavaria Studios in Munich. The film's sets were designed by the art director Ludwig Reiber.

Cast 
 Marianne Koch as Konstanze
 Paul Hubschmid as Georg
 Peter Mosbacher as Karl
 Richard Romanowsky as Leopold
 Adrienne Gessner as Karoline
 Eva Maria Meineke as Emily
 Helmuth Lohner as Franz
 Frank Holms as Bob
 Anneliese Egerer as Mizzi
 Otto Storr as Mr. Namarra
 Michl Lang as Bootsführer auf dem Königssee
 Claire Reigbert as Mrs. Namarra
 Franzl Lang as Jodler
 Liesl Karlstadt as Vroni
 Franz-Otto Krüger as Hotelmanager
 Theodor Danegger as Kellner
 Karl Hanft as Ferdl
 Petra Unkel
 José Held as Pianist
 Vera Complojer as Marktfrau

See also 
A Salzburg Comedy (1943)

References

Bibliography 
 Bock, Hans-Michael & Bergfelder, Tim. The Concise CineGraph. Encyclopedia of German Cinema. Berghahn Books, 2009.

External links 
 

1957 films
1957 romantic comedy films
German romantic comedy films
West German films
1950s German-language films
Films directed by Kurt Hoffmann
Films based on German novels
Films based on works by Erich Kästner
Remakes of German films
Films set in Salzburg
Films set in the 1930s
Constantin Film films
Films shot at Bavaria Studios
1950s German films